In mathematics, the affine group or general affine group of any affine space over a field  is the group of all invertible affine transformations from the space into itself.

It is a Lie group if  is the real or complex field or quaternions.

Relation to general linear group

Construction from general linear group

In terms of matrices, one writes:

Stabilizer of a point

In the case that the affine group was constructed by starting with a vector space, the subgroup that stabilizes the origin (of the vector space) is the original .

Matrix representation

This can be represented as the  block matrix

A similar representation is any  matrix in which the entries in each column sum to 1. The similarity  for passing from the above kind to this kind is the  identity matrix with the bottom row replaced by a row of all ones.

Each of these two classes of matrices is closed under matrix multiplication.

The simplest paradigm may well be the case , that is, the upper triangular  matrices representing the affine group in one dimension.

so that

Character table of  
 has order . Since

we know  has  conjugacy classes, namely

Then we know that  has  irreducible representations. By above paragraph,  there exist  one-dimensional representations, decided by the homomorphism

hence  is the dimension of the last irreducible representation. Finally using the orthogonality of irreducible representations, we can complete the character table of :

Planar affine group over the reals
The elements of  can take a simple form on a well-chosen affine coordinate system.

Case 1 corresponds to translations.

Case 2 corresponds to scalings that may different in two different directions. When working with a Euclidean plane these directions need not to be perpendicular, since the coordinate axes need not to be perpendicular.

Case 3 corresponds to a scaling in one direction and a translation in another one.

Case 4 corresponds to a shear mapping combined with a dilation.

Case 5 corresponds to a shear mapping combined with a dilation.

Case 6 corresponds to similarities, when the coordinate axes are perpendicular.

The affine transformations without any fixed point belong to cases 1, 3, and 5. The transformations that do not preserve the orientation of the plane belong to cases 2 (with ) or 3 (with ).

The proof may be done by first remarking that if an affine transformation has no fixed point, then the matrix of the associated linear map has an eigenvalue equal to one, and then using the Jordan normal form theorem for real matrices.

Other affine groups

General case

one gets an associated affine group : one can say that the affine group obtained is "a group extension by a vector representation", and as above, one has the short exact sequence:

Special affine group

The subset of all invertible affine transformations that preserve a fixed volume form is called the special affine group. This group is the affine analogue of the special linear group.

Projective subgroup
Presuming knowledge of projectivity and the projective group of projective geometry, the affine group can be easily specified. For example, Günter Ewald wrote:

Poincaré group

The Poincaré group is the affine group of the Lorentz group :

This example is very important in relativity.

See also
 Affine Coxeter group – certain discrete subgroups of the affine group on a Euclidean space that preserve a lattice
 Holomorph

Notes

References

 

Affine geometry
Group theory
Lie groups